The 1910 Major League Baseball season was contested from April 14 to October 23, 1910. The Chicago Cubs and Philadelphia Athletics were the regular season champions of the National League and American League, respectively. The Athletics then defeated the Cubs in the World Series, four games to one.

Awards and honors
Chalmers Award
Ty Cobb, Detroit Tigers, OF
Nap Lajoie, Cleveland Naps

Statistical leaders

Standings

American League

National League

Postseason

Bracket

Managers

American League

National League

Events
 April 4 – William Howard Taft is the first American president to throw the ceremonial first pitch at a game.
 July 19 – Cy Young of the Cleveland Indians wins his 500th career game with a 5–4 victory over the Washington Senators.

References

External links
1910 Major League Baseball season schedule at Baseball Reference Fetched July 1, 2012
1910 in baseball history from ThisGreatGame.com

 
Major League Baseball seasons